The Very Best of the Human League is a greatest hits compilation by British band The Human League. It was released in the UK on 15 September 2003 and went into the UK album charts at #24.

The album includes the greatest hits released from the band, spanning from their debut album 1979's Reproduction, to the 2001 album Secrets. A bonus remix CD is also included.

A DVD also called The Very Best of the Human League was released to coincide with the album, the DVD contains nineteen music videos.

Track listing 
 "Don't You Want Me" (1981)
 "Love Action (I Believe in Love)" (1981)
 "Open Your Heart" (1981)
 "The Sound of the Crowd" (1981)
 "Mirror Man" (1982)
 "(Keep Feeling) Fascination" (1983)
 "The Lebanon" (1984)
 "Life on Your Own" (1984)
 "Together in Electric Dreams" (1984)
 "Louise" (1984)
 "Human" (1986)
 "Heart Like a Wheel" (1990)
 "Tell Me When" (1994)
 "One Man in My Heart" (1995)
 "All I Ever Wanted" (2001)
 "Being Boiled" (Fast version) (1978)
 "Empire State Human" (1979)

Bonus CD
 "Don't You Want Me (Majik J Original Booty Vocal Mix)"
 "Open Your Heart (Laid Remix)"
 "The Sound of the Crowd (Trisco's PopClash Mix)"
 "Love Action (I Believe in Love) (Brooks Red Line Vocal Mix)"
 "(Keep Feeling) Fascination (Groove Collision TMC Mix)"
 "Empire State Human (Chamber's Reproduced Mix)"
 "Things That Dreams Are Made Of (Jimmy 19 The A509 PWC Remix)"
 "The Sound of the Crowd (Freaksblamredo)"
 "Open Your Heart (The Strand Remix)"
 "The Sound of the Crowd (Riton Re-Rub)"
 "Love Action (Fluke's Dub Action Remix)"

References

2003 greatest hits albums
The Human League compilation albums
Virgin Records compilation albums
2003 remix albums
Virgin Records remix albums